In mathematics, the entropy influence conjecture is a statement about Boolean functions originally conjectured by Ehud Friedgut and Gil Kalai in 1996.

Statement
For a function  note its Fourier expansion

 

The entropy–influence conjecture states that there exists an absolute constant C such that  where the total influence  is defined by

 

and the entropy  (of the spectrum) is defined by

 

(where x log x is taken to be 0 when x = 0).

See also
 Analysis of Boolean functions

References 

 Unsolved Problems in Number Theory, Logic and Cryptography
 The Open Problems Project, discrete and computational geometry problems

Entropy
Conjectures